Ballophilus flavescens is a species of centipede in the genus Ballophilus. It is found in Cambodia, Laos, and Vietnam. The original description of this species is based on male specimens measuring 21 mm in length, pale yellow in color, with 63 to 69 pairs of legs.

References 

Ballophilidae
Animals described in 1938